The 2013 IRB Junior World Championship was the sixth annual international rugby union competition for Under 20 national teams. The event was organised in France by rugby's governing body, the IRB. A total of twelve nations played in the tournament. South Africa went into the tournament as defending champions, after winning the tournament for the first time in 2012. England were crowned the 2013 champions for the first time after defeating Wales 23–15 in the final on the 23 June at Stade de la Rabine in Vannes.

After finishing last at the 2012 IRB Junior World Championship, Italy were relegated to the IRB Junior World Trophy and therefore didn't participate in this year's event. After finishing first at the 2012 IRB Junior World Rugby Trophy, the United States were promoted to this competition for 2013. Their stay in the IRB Junior World Championship was short-lived, however, as they lost in the 11th-place final to Fiji 46–12 and were relegated to the IRB Junior World Trophy, being replaced for the 2014 competition by its winners Italy.

Venues
The championship was held in La Roche-sur-Yon, Vannes and Nantes in France. In an effort to improve TV broadcasting for all matches, only three venues were used.

For the first time since the competitions inception, the final was contested by two northern hemisphere teams. Also for the first time New Zealand did not participate in the final.

Teams
The following teams participated in the 2013 IRB Junior World Championship:

1  were promoted from the 2012 IRB Junior World Rugby Trophy.

Pool stage
The following playing schedule was released in November 2012:

All times are in Central European Summer Time (UTC+2).

Pool A

Pool B

Pool C

Pool stage rankings

Knockout stage

9–12th place play-offs

Semi-finals

11th place game

9th place game

5–8th place play-offs

Semi-finals

7th place game

5th place game

Finals

Semi-finals

Third place game

Final

References 

2013
2013 rugby union tournaments for national teams
2012–13 in French rugby union
International rugby union competitions hosted by France
Sport in Vannes
rugby union